Anna Caritas Nitschmann, Countess von Zinzendorf und Pottendorf, (24 November 1715, Kunín, Moravia – 21 May 1760, Herrnhut, Lusatia) was a Moravian Brethren missionary (Missionarin), lyrical poet, and the second wife of Count Nicolaus Ludwig Zinzendorf. By virtue of her marriage, she became a member of the House of Zinzendorf, one of the most prominent noble families in the region.

Biography 
Born as the younger daughter of David Nitschmann (1676-1758) and his wife, Anna Schneider (1680-1735), she served as the Chief Eldress of the Renewed Moravian Church for most of her life, from the age of 14. Her duties as Chief Eldress were to serve as a spiritual mentor and counsellor to the female members of the congregations.

Most of her life was spent in close connection with the Zinzendorf household, although a couple of years were spent doing itinerant mission work among the women of southeastern Pennsylvania. She then returned to Europe to resume her work among the various Moravian congregations. After the death of Zinzendorf's first wife, she was married to him on 27 June 1757, but both of them died within a couple of years. She is buried in Herrnhut, Germany.

See also

 Hussite
 Peace churches

References

External links
 https://web.archive.org/web/20060908165840/http://www.zinzendorf.com/anna.htm
 Biography of Anna Nitschmann

1715 births
1760 deaths
People from Nový Jičín District
18th-century Bohemian poets
Czech women writers
German women poets
Writers of the Moravian Church
Moravian Church missionaries
Moravian-German people
Female Christian missionaries
German Protestant missionaries
Czech women poets
Czech Protestant missionaries
Protestant missionaries in the United States
18th-century Bohemian women